Circica is a genus of sedge moths. It is mostly treated as a synonym of Glyphipterix, but is considered valid by some authors.

Species
 Circica cionophora
 Circica xestobela

References

External links
 Circica at Zipcodezoo.com
 Circica at Global Species

Glyphipterigidae